The Hamang Tunnel is a road tunnel that runs under Hamang northwest of Sandvika in Norway. It forms a part of the European route E16. It was named Hamangporten in 1991, but the name was changed after two months at the demand of the Norwegian Public Roads Administration, who deemed the name Hamangporten to be "most unfortunate".

References

Tunnels in Bærum
Road tunnels in Viken
1991 establishments in Norway
Tunnels completed in 1991